William M. Jurney is a United States Marine Corps lieutenant general who serves as commander of United States Marine Corps Forces, Pacific since August 18, 2022. He most recently served as commanding general of the II Marine Expeditionary Force from July 8, 2021 to August 18, 2022. He previously served as Commanding General of the Marine Air-Ground Task Force Training Command and Marine Corps Air Ground Combat Center and prior to that was the Commanding General of the 3rd Marine Division.

References

External links

Year of birth missing (living people)
Living people
Place of birth missing (living people)
United States Marine Corps generals